Dibenzyl ketone, or 1,3-diphenylacetone, is an organic compound composed of two benzyl groups attached to a central carbonyl group. This results in the central carbonyl carbon atom being electrophilic and the two adjacent carbon atoms slightly nucleophilic. For this reason, dibenzyl ketone is frequently used in an aldol condensation reaction with benzil (a dicarbonyl) and base to create tetraphenylcyclopentadienone. Vera Bogdanovskaia is credited with the classification of dibenzyl ketone.

Preparation
One method is where phenylacetic acid is reacted with acetic anhydride and anhydrous potassium acetate and refluxed for two hours at 140−150 °C. The mixture is distilled slowly so that the distillate is mostly acetic acid. Carbon dioxide is released in this reaction. The resultant liquid is a mixture of dibenzyl ketone and minor impurities. Heating the mixture above 200−205 °C leads to resinification with a decrease in the yield of the ketone.

A more convenient method is adding a solution of phenylacetic acid in dry dichloromethane dropwise to a solution of DCC and DMAP in dry dichloromethane, then stirring for 24 hours. The resulting reaction mixture is filtered to remove dicyclohexylurea, evaporated to dryness, then purified by column chromatography on silica gel. This method is also used for substituted derivatives of phenylacetic acid, such as 4-bromophenylacetic acid, to prepare the corresponding symmetric bisbenzyl ketone derivative (in this case 1,3-bis(4-bromophenyl)acetic acid).

References

Dibenzyl ketones
Benzyl compounds